Abraham Damar Grahita (born 8 October 1995) is an Indonesian professional basketball player that currently plays for Veltex Shizuoka of the Japanese Basketball League (B3). Grahita attended Esa Unggul University where he was a member of their basketball team from 2013 to 2018. Grahita plays as a combo-guard in his basketball team. He also became the first ever Indonesian professional basketball player to receive his own signature shoes with the release of Ardilles x DBL, AD1. AD2 was released on 1 July 2022 and its represent the SeaGames Gold Medal.

Early career
Grahita was born in Pangkal Pinang, the capital and largest city of Bangka Belitung Islands located at the southeastern coasts of the island of Sumatra. He excelled at the sport of basketball throughout his high school years. However, he did not receive much exposure due to living at the rural area of Indonesia. After much supports and help from his friends, coach and family, Grahita decided to venture to Jakarta to find better competition and to pursue a career in basketball. His coach eventually managed to recommend Grahita to Stadium Jakarta, a professional team that participated in Indonesia's professional basketball league, IBL. Through Stadium, Grahita was given a scholarship to study at Esa Unggul University and also joined the school's basketball team where he played until turning professional in 2015. During this time, he also practiced with Stadium and even played in one of the pre-season game where he scored 18 points and grabbed 6 rebounds.

Professional career 

He played in a variety of professional places, which includes: Stadium Jakarta (2015–16), Stapac Jakarta (2016–2019), Indonesia Patriots (2020), Prawira Bandung (2021–present). He wasn't able to be part of the  2021 FIBA Asia Cup qualifiers

Career statistics

IBL

Regular season

Playoffs

International 
{| class="wikitable sortable"
!Year
!Competition
!GP
!Min
!FG%
!3P%
!FT%
!APG
!RPG
!SPG
!BPG
!PPG
|-
|2014
|2014 ASEAN University Games
|5
|0.0
|0.0
|0.0
|0.0
|0.0
|0.0
|0.0
|0.0
|0.0
|-
|2016
|2016 ASEAN University Games
|5
|0.0
|0.0
|0.0
|0.0
|0.0
|0.0
|0.0
|0.0
|0.0
|-
|2018
|Test Event Asian Games 2018
|4
|0.0
|0.0
|0.0
|0.0
|0.0
|0.0
|0.0
|0.0
|0.0
|-
|- class="sortbottom"
| style="text-align:center;" colspan="2" | Career
|14.0
|0.0
|0.0
|0.0
|0.0
|0.0
|0.0
|0.0
|0.0
|0.0

References

External links
 
 Daniel Wenas
 Daniel Wenas
 

1995 births
Living people
Competitors at the 2017 Southeast Asian Games
Competitors at the 2019 Southeast Asian Games
Guards (basketball)
Indonesian men's basketball players
People from Pangkal Pinang
Southeast Asian Games medalists in basketball
Southeast Asian Games silver medalists for Indonesia
Sportspeople from the Bangka Belitung Islands
Basketball players at the 2018 Asian Games
Asian Games competitors for Indonesia
Competitors at the 2021 Southeast Asian Games
Southeast Asian Games gold medalists for Indonesia
21st-century Indonesian people